Türkmən (also, Turkman) is a village in the Goychay Rayon of Azerbaijan. The village forms part of the municipality of Kürdəmiş.

References 

Azerbaijan Parliament

Populated places in Goychay District